Standings and results for Group B of the UEFA Euro 2008 qualifying tournament.

Italy and France secured qualification to the tournament proper on 17 November 2007 following Italy's 2–1 win against Scotland, becoming the fifth and sixth teams in the whole of the qualification stage to do so.

Standings

Matches
Group B fixtures were decided with a random draw conducted on Thursday 9 March 2006, because fixtures could not be agreed between delegates. Ukraine were the only side unable to come to consensus with the rest of the group.

Goalscorers

References 
UEFA website

Group B
2006–07 in French football
qual
2006–07 in Scottish football
2007–08 in Scottish football
2006–07 in Italian football
qual
2006–07 in Ukrainian football
2007–08 in Ukrainian football
2006–07 in Georgian football
2007–08 in Georgian football
2006 in Lithuanian football
2007 in Lithuanian football
2006 in Faroe Islands football
2007 in Faroe Islands football